Chloe Stewart may refer to:

Chloe Stewart, original name for Miley Stewart, fictional character
Chloe Stewart, candidate for Glasgow Cathcart (Scottish Parliament constituency)